Slobodan Kačar (born 15 September 1957) is a retired Serbian boxer who was the IBF Light-Heavyweight world champion. He won the Light Heavyweight Gold medal for Yugoslavia at the 1980 Summer Olympics. In the same year, Kačar was named as the best athlete of Yugoslavia.

Amateur career
Compiled a reported record of 241–9
Bronze Medal (Middleweight) at the 1978 World Championships in Belgrade
Gold Medal (Light Heavyweight) representing Yugoslavia at the 1980 Summer Olympics in Moscow
Defeated Michael Nassoro (Tanzania) KO 2
Defeated David Kvachadze (Soviet Union) points
Defeated Herbert Bauch (East Germany) TKO 2
Defeated Paweł Skrzecz (Poland) points (4–1)

Professional career
Kačar turned professional in 1983 and won his first 21 fights, including a victory over Eddie Mustafa Muhammad to capture the vacant IBF Light Heavyweight Title. Kačar lost his next fight, a defense against Bobby Czyz in 1986, via 5th-round TKO. Kačar retired the next year with a record of 22–2–0.

Professional boxing record

Personal life
In 2003, Kačar became president of the Boxing Association of Serbia. His elder brother Tadija Kačar won a silver medal in boxing at the 1976 Summer Olympics. His nephew Gojko Kačar is an international football player.

References

External links

 Bio sam Dandijeva zvezda, Blic, December 7, 2008

1957 births
Living people
People from Central Bosnia Canton
Yugoslav male boxers
Serbian male boxers
Bosnia and Herzegovina male boxers
Light-heavyweight boxers
World light-heavyweight boxing champions
International Boxing Federation champions
Olympic boxers of Yugoslavia
Olympic gold medalists for Yugoslavia
Olympic medalists in boxing
Boxers at the 1980 Summer Olympics
Medalists at the 1980 Summer Olympics
AIBA World Boxing Championships medalists
Competitors at the 1979 Mediterranean Games
Mediterranean Games gold medalists for Yugoslavia
Mediterranean Games medalists in boxing
Serbs of Bosnia and Herzegovina